Brooke Louise Hepburn (born 19 April 1990) is an Australian former cricketer who played for Tasmanian Tigers and Hobart Hurricanes.

Born in Launceston, Hepburn did not begin playing cricket until she was 19 years old.  Just one year later, the Tasmanian Roar gave her a Rookie contract for the 2010–11 season.  She has said that "Although I missed out on playing underage cricket for Tassie, I got plenty of competitive bowling practice in the backyard against my older (and very competitive!) sister!"

From May to August 2015, Hepburn played in Ireland for Scorchers in the Women's Super 3s, a competition involving both 50 over and T20 matches.

At the start of the 2016–17 season, Hepburn was appointed vice-captain of Tasmanian Roar.  According to Roar coach Julia Price, "Brooke's elevation to vice-captain comes from her 'lead by example' approach to her cricket particularly over the last two years."  In October 2016, during the opening round of that season's WNCL, Hepburn top scored for the Roar in the match against Queensland Fire with 38 runs, and then took 5–39 against the South Australian Scorpions to become the first Roar player to achieve a 5-wicket haul.

Hepburn was part of the Hurricanes squad for its inaugural WBBL01 season (2015–16).  A highlight of that season for the Hurricanes was her 2–17 against the Melbourne Stars.  She was also a member of the Hurricanes squad for the  WBBL02 season (2016–17). In November 2018, she was named in the Hobart Hurricanes' squad for the 2018–19 Women's Big Bash League season.

On 11 June 2021, it was confirmed that Hepburn had retired from cricket.

Outside of cricket, Hepburn works as a Dietitian for Leap Health and the Tasmanian Institute of Sport.

References

External links

Brooke Hepburn at Cricket Australia

1990 births
Australian women cricketers
Hobart Hurricanes (WBBL) cricketers
Living people
Cricketers from Launceston, Tasmania
Sportswomen from Tasmania
Tasmanian Tigers (women's cricket) cricketers
Scorchers (women's cricket) cricketers